Hiroshi Karube (軽部 弘, Karube Hitoshi) is a paralympic swimmer from Japan competing mainly in category SB3 events.

Hiroshi competed as part of the Japanese Paralympic swimming team at both the 2004 and 2008 Summer Paralympics.  In the 2004 games he swam in the 50m freestyle finishing fifth in his heat, 50m breaststroke finishing fifth in the final, 100m freestyle finishing seventh, 150m medley finishing eighth, 200m freestyle finishing seventh, he was also part of both the Japanese 4x50m freestyle team that finished seventh and the 4x50m medley that failed to make the final.  In the 2004 games he had more success winning a bronze medal in the 50m breaststroke, finished sixth in the individual medley and the Japanese team finished fourth in the 4x50m freestyle.

References

External links
 

Paralympic swimmers of Japan
Swimmers at the 2000 Summer Paralympics
Swimmers at the 2004 Summer Paralympics
Paralympic bronze medalists for Japan
Japanese male breaststroke swimmers
Japanese male freestyle swimmers
Japanese male medley swimmers
Living people
Medalists at the 2004 Summer Paralympics
Year of birth missing (living people)
Paralympic medalists in swimming
S5-classified Paralympic swimmers
21st-century Japanese people